Jenny Genoveva Maakal (2 August 1913 – 15 September 2002) was a South African freestyle swimmer who competed in the 1932 Summer Olympics.

She was born in Rayton.

In the 1932 Olympics she won a bronze medal in the 400 m freestyle event and was sixth in the 100 m freestyle event.

Maakal also competed in the 1930 British Empire Games and swam in two finals. Four years later she won the silver medal in the 440 yards freestyle competition and as member of the South African team in the 4×110 yards freestyle relay contest.

See also
 List of Olympic medalists in swimming (women)

External links
Jenny Maakal's profile at Sports Reference.com
Jennie Maakal article in Swimming History of southern Africa

1913 births
2002 deaths
Sportspeople from Pretoria
South African female swimmers
South African female freestyle swimmers
Olympic swimmers of South Africa
Swimmers at the 1932 Summer Olympics
Olympic bronze medalists for South Africa
Swimmers at the 1930 British Empire Games
Swimmers at the 1934 British Empire Games
Commonwealth Games silver medallists for South Africa
Olympic bronze medalists in swimming
Medalists at the 1932 Summer Olympics
Commonwealth Games medallists in swimming
20th-century South African women
21st-century South African women
Medallists at the 1934 British Empire Games